Canino is a town and comune of Italy, in the province of Viterbo (northern Lazio) in the internal part of Maremma Laziale.

It is also near the ancient Etruscan town of Vulci, and  the destroyed city of Castro. Lucien Bonaparte, brother of Napoleon, was lord of Canino and is buried in the town's collegiate church. Canino was also a residence of the Farnese family; future pope Paul III was born here in 1468.

The hills that surround Canino reach the Selva del Lamone and are cultivated with grapes and olive, the famous olive oil extra vergine di oliva, from the "Canina" olive variety, has been given DOP with Reg. CE n. 1263/96.

References

Cities and towns in Lazio